NCRA is an initialism which may stand for:

 National Centre for Radio Astrophysics, a premier Radio Astronomy research institute in Pune, India
 National Campus and Community Radio Association, a non-profit association of campus radio and community radio stations in Canada
 National Coalition for Reform and Advancement, a political coalition in the Solomon Islands
 National Cooperative Refinery Association, an energy cooperative in Kansas, US
 National Court Reporters Association, a US organization committed to advancing the profession of court reporting
 North Coast Railroad Authority, a US organization to restore and preserve rail service along the Northwestern Pacific rail line.
 Northern California Recycling Association, an environmental organization in California, US
 Nottinghamshire County Rowing Association, an elite rowing organization from Nottingham, England (1981-2006)